Bethlehem of Galilee (Beit Lehem HaGlilit; lit. "the Galilean Bethlehem") is a moshav in northern Israel. Located in the Galilee near Kiryat Tivon, around 10 kilometres north-west of Nazareth and 30 kilometres east of Haifa, it falls under the jurisdiction of the Jezreel Valley Regional Council.

The modern moshav is located at the site of the ancient Israelite settlement known as Bethlehem of Zebulun or Berlehem Zoria. Due to its proximity to Nazareth, one historian believes that it is the Bethlehem where Jesus of Nazareth was born. Aviram Oshri, a senior archaeologist with the Israeli Antiquities Authority, supports this claim, but other researchers at the same institution reject it. The town existed as a Christian settlement in the classic era and was populated during the Middle Ages. It was reestablished as a German Templer Colony in Palestine in the 19th century and turned into a Jewish moshav in 1948.

History
To distinguish the city from the city of Bethlehem near Jerusalem, it was originally known as Bethlehem of Zebulun, whilst the town near Jerusalem was called "Bethlehem of Judea". In the Jerusalem Talmud it is referred to as Beth Lehem Zoria, as it was part of the kingdom of Tyre at the time. According to the Book of Judges, one of the so-called "Minor Judges" of early settlement Israel, Ibzan, came from Bethlehem and was buried there. The Cambridge Bible for Schools and Colleges suggests that the Bethlehem referred to in this passage is Bethlehem of Galilee "rather than the more famous Bethlehem in the Tribe of Judah".

Until the late 19th century, ruins of a church and a synagogue could be seen there, and archaeological findings "from the early Roman Period" show it was a prosperous city, so the biblical Bethlehem of Zebulon is identified by archaeologists with today's Bethlehem of Galilee.

Due to its proximity to Nazareth, one historian believes that it is the Bethlehem where Jesus was born. Aviram Oshri, a senior archaeologist with the Israeli Antiquities Authority, supports this claim, although others at this institution reject it.

Major building remains  and pottery from the fourth–fifth century Byzantine era have been found here, together with major remains from  Umayyad, Abbasid (eighth century CE)  and  Mamluk eras (fourteenth–fifteenth centuries CE).

Ottoman period

Arab village
The population was 27 households and two bachelors, all Muslim. They paid a tax rate of 25% on agricultural products, which included wheat, barley, cotton, vegetable and fruit gardens, occasional revenues, goats and beehives; a total of 1200 Akçe.

In 1859, the British consul Rogers stated that the population was 110, and the tillage at sixteen feddans.

In 1875 Victor Guérin visited and noted that Bethlehem was a small village, which had succeeded a town of the same name. He further noted the ruins of two buildings; one, completely destroyed, had been constructed of good cut stones; the entrance was at the south façade. He thought, from its orientation north and south, that it was a synagogue. The other building, which lay east and west, may have been a Christian church. On its site were seen a few shafts, four of which were still in situ and half covered up.

In 1882, the Palestine Exploration Fund's Survey of Western Palestine described it as "The ancient Bethlehem of Zebulon. A village principally built of adobe on high ground in the border of the wooded country. The nearest water is in Wady el Melek, on the north (Ras el 'Ain), and at the springs near Muwarah on the south."

A population list from about 1887 showed that Kh. Beit Lahm had about 55  inhabitants, all Muslims.

Templer village
In 1906 Templers from the German Colony in Haifa established a colony in  Galilee, naming it for the ancient city.

British Mandate period
In the 1922 census of Palestine conducted by the British authorities, Bait Lam had a population of 224; 111 Christians and 113 Muslims. Of the Christians, 95 were Protestant and 16 were Greek Catholics (Melkites). This had increased slightly by the 1931 census to a population of 235; 135 Muslim, 99 Christians and 1 Jew, in a total of 51 inhabited houses.

 
In 1932 the Nazi Party gained its first two members in Palestine; Karl Ruff and Walter Aberle from the Templer colony in Haifa. In the course of the 1930s, Bethlehemites also joined the party, indicating the fading affinity to the Templers' original ideals. By August 1939, 17% of all German Christians in Palestine were members of the Nazi Party. After the Nazi takeover in Germany, all international schools of German language subsidized or fully financed by government funds were obliged to employ teachers aligned to the Nazi Party. In 1933, Templer functionaries appealed to Paul von Hindenburg and the Foreign Office not to use swastika symbols for German institutions in Palestine and voiced opposition to the boycott of German Jewish shops. Later, this opposition subsided. On 20 August 1939 the German government called on German Christians in Palestine to join the Wehrmacht and 350 men enlisted.

After the start of World War II, all Germans in Palestine were declared enemy aliens. The British authorities sent them to Sarona, Bethlehem (Galilee), Waldheim (today's Allonei Abba) and Wilhelma. In summer 1941, 665 German internees, mostly young families with children, were deported to Australia, leaving those who were too old or sick. In December 1941 and in the course of 1942 another 400 German internees, mostly wives and children of men who had enlisted in the Wehrmacht, were released - via Turkey - to Germany for the purpose of family reunification.

In the 1945 statistics the population of Beit Lam consisted of 370 people; 210 Muslims and  160 Christians, and the total land area was 7,526 dunams according to an official land and population survey. 6 dunams of land were designated for citrus and bananas, 278 dunams for plantations and irrigable land, 4,796 for cereals, while 51 dunams were built-up areas.

In 1945 the Italian and Hungarian internees were released but the Britons refused to repatriate the remaining German internees to the British zone in Germany. In 1947, they were allowed to emigrate to Australia.

Israel
On 17 April 1948 the Haganah captured the village, and it was subsequently depopulated. By 14 May 1948, when Israel declared independence, only 50 Templers remained in the country. It was resettled by Jewish farmers, becoming a moshav. Much of the original Templer architecture survives, and is similar in style to the homes built by the Templers in other parts of the country, such as Sarona in Tel Aviv, Wilhelma (today Bnei Atarot) and the German colonies of Haifa and Jerusalem.

In recent years, tourism has replaced agriculture as the main economic branch. A dairy, an herb farm, restaurants and country-style accommodation are among the tourist-oriented businesses in the village today.

References

Bibliography

 
  

 
 
  

 
Negev, Avraham/Gibson, S., 2001, Archaeological Encyclopedia of the Holy Land, New York/London
 

Sauer, Paul: Vom Land um den Asperg im Namen Gottes nach Palästina und Australien: Die wechselvolle Geschichte der Tempelgesellschaft, lecture held on 20 October 1995 in Burgstetten on the occasion of the 750th anniversary of Kirschenhardthof, printed as Schriftenreihe TG, No. 1 (1996)

External links
Survey of Western Palestine, Map 5:    IAA, Wikimedia commons

Ancient Jewish settlements of Galilee
Moshavim
Populated places established in 1906
1906 establishments in Ottoman Syria
Templer settlements
Hebrew Bible cities
Populated places in Northern District (Israel)